Burning Blue is an American play written by D.M.W. Greer (born August 23, 1957), based on his experiences as a U.S. Navy aviator. Playwright Greer wrote about a U.S. Navy accident investigation which became a gay witch hunt during the "Don't Ask, Don't Tell" era.

Background
In 1992, Greer wrote his first play, Burning Blue, based on his knowledge of events surrounding the treatment of gay servicemen in the U.S. Navy, which premiered at The King's Head Theatre on London’s fringe in 1995. The play opened to great critical acclaim.  West End producer Robert Fox took it to The Theatre Royal, Haymarket, where the play received Evening Standard nominations and won two Olivier Awards: for John Napier’s set design and David Hersey’s sound design.  The play opened in Cape Town and then Johannesburg in 1996.

Burning Blue then opened in Tel Aviv’s Beit Lessin Theatre, where it also won critical praise and played to full houses for 18 months. In 1998, John Hickok returned to direct the American premiere in Los Angeles at the Court Theatre, where it was an instant hit with the Los Angeles Times.  Kevin Otto (from the South Africa production) reprised his role as Lieutenant Dan Lynch, and Martin McDougall – who originated the role of Lieutenant JG Charlie Trumbo in London – returned to play the role again.  They were joined by Tim DeKay in the role of Lieutenant Will Stephensen, originally played by Irish actor and director Ian FitzGibbon in London. Productions followed in San Francisco later that year and finally in New York in 2002.

The film adaptation, starring Trent Ford and Rob Mayes and directed by Greer, began production in 2010. Released in 2014 as a feature film, it met with mixed critical reviews.

Plot 
Best friends Lieutenants Daniel Lynch and Will Stephensen are U.S. Navy fighter pilots flying the McDonnell Douglas F/A-18 Hornet, hoping to become the youngest pilots to be accepted into the space program. After two accidents, one of which is due to Will’s failing eyesight, their unit is subject to an NCIS investigation led by John Cokely.

At the same time, a third pilot, Matt Blackwood, arrives on the carrier and quickly develops a close friendship with Dan, driving a wedge between Dan and Will. Cokely’s investigation leads to him uncovering rumours about Dan and Matt’s relationship just as they both begin to fall in love. When Matt decides to leave his wife and move in with Dan, there is a third accident and Cokely’s investigation ramps up the pressure on Dan.

Reception
Initial reviews for Burning Blue were predominantly positive, but many American critics took a more contrary view as later staging did not reflect the changing acceptance of homosexual relationships. Don Shewey in The Advocate wrote, "DMW Greer’s play Burning Blue takes a Reefer Madness approach to homosexuality. Ostensibly a fictional condemnation of the U.S. military’s hypocritical "don’t ask, don’t tell" approach to gay servicemen, this far-fetched melodrama presents homosexuality as a kind of science-fiction virus transmitted by the heady combination of red lights and disco music." He wondered, "And how on earth has such a nonsensical sub-soap-opera script gotten productions in London, Los Angeles, San Francisco, and New York?"

Dan Bacalzo in a review of a New York performance, questioned why, "... 'Burning Blue' is supposedly set after President Clinton's 'Don't Ask, Don't Tell' policy was instated, yet there is no specific mention of that policy." His review ended with the opinion that, "At its best, 'Burning Blue' is a vehement rebuttal to a military practice that is unfair and discriminatory. But unlike Marc Wolf's Another American: Asking and Telling, which also addressed the topic of gays in the military, Greer's play overstates its case without ever achieving the emotional depth that the topic merits."

References

Notes

External links
 
 

1992 plays
Off-Broadway plays
LGBT-related plays
American plays adapted into films